Marmot Island is an island of the Kodiak Archipelago in the Gulf of Alaska in the U.S. state of Alaska. It is part of Kodiak Island Borough and lies east of Afognak Island. The island has a land area of 45.196 km2 (17.45 sq mi) and is unpopulated.

References

Islands of the Kodiak Archipelago
Uninhabited islands of Alaska
Islands of Alaska